The Council of Europe Development Bank is a development bank, granting loans to member states to help disaster victims, help with job creation, and improve social infrastructure. , its assets stood at 28 billion euros, which it uses to co-finance projects by means of loans of up to 40% of the project cost.

Situated in Paris, the Bank is a separate legal entity and is autonomous in its decision-making. It has a high credit rating from Moody's, Standard and Poor's and Fitch Ratings.

History
The CEB dates from 1956, when the Council of Europe established the Resettlement Fund for National Refugees and Over-Population in Europe as a Partial Agreement. In 1994, it changed its name to the Council of Europe Social Development Fund, before becoming the Council of Europe Development Bank in 1999.

The original aim was to help refugees and other displaced persons after the Second World War. It later expanded its scope of activities to include assistance to disaster victims, help with job creation, and improve social infrastructure. Its aim today is to promote social cohesion in its member states.

Membership
There are currently 42 member states, as follows:

Except for the Holy See and Kosovo, all member states are also members of the Council of Europe.

See also
 European Bank for Reconstruction and Development
 European Central Bank
 European Investment Bank
 International Monetary Fund
 World Bank

References

Supranational banks
International development multilaterals
Multilateral development banks
Council of Europe